Fantastic Four Adventures is part of Marvel UK's 'Collector's Edition' line.  It is being published by Panini Comics but reprints Marvel Comics from the United States. It began in 2005 around the release of the Fantastic Four film and follows the format established by the Collector's Edition Range. Fantastic Four Adventures is sold once every 28 days through newsagents, although a subscription offer is available. Fantastic Four Adventures retailed at £2.40 upon its release, but rising in printing costs have seen the price rise to £2.50 and then onto the current price of £2.95. It was announced at the end of 2011 that Fantastic Four Adventures would cease publication with its final issue in March 2012, only to be replaced by a new CE, Incredible Hulks.

Format
Fantastic Four Adventures has 76 pages of which there is a contents page on the inside cover and a letters page on the inside back cover, named the "Fantastic Forum". It features very few advertisements, normally 4 of the 76 pages, which is very few compared to the American comics it reprints. All the advertisements are for Marvel-related merchandise. So far, only the first issue is the only one published to be extended to 100 pages. The cover is made out of a thick card unlike the US comics which is made of normal glossy paper. The printing work is of high quality. It currently reprints modern (about two years old) Fantastic Four comics as two of its three 22-page stories.  The 3rd story is a 'classic' story, a story originally printed in the 1960s. Currently it is reprinting the original Fantastic Four stories by Stan Lee and Jack Kirby that established the characters from issue 1, but ended with 'The Thing No More', first printed within Fantastic Four #78. No classic featured in the last issue.

Content
It began by printing stories by Carlos Pacheco and the run by Mark Waid and the late Mike Wieringo, but last printed Mark Millar's and Jonathan Hickman's individual runs on Fantastic Four. It has also printed the Thing miniseries Freakshow, Reed Richards Before the Fantastic Four, as well as Fantastic Four: The End. The comic magazine ended with the final arc of 'Three', the story that depicted the death of Johnny Storm, and a story entitled 'Uncles', originally printed in issue #588 of the US publication of Fantastic Four.

Readers will be unable to read the tales by Hickman depicting the aftermath of Johnny Storm's death which results in the formation of the FF featuring Spider-man, or The Human Torch's return, due to the cancellation of the publication. However, the Spider-man arc entitled 'Fantastic Voyage' will feature in 'Astonishing Spider-man' #67-68, published by Panini.

References

Marvel UK titles